Wings of Vi is a 2D platform game created by Grynsoft, a Danish indie developer team led by Jesper "Solgryn" Erlandsen. The game, a spiritual successor to I Wanna Be The Boshy, focuses on saving the world from a demon lord named Jeh'Oul. Development started in July 2012, and the game was released on November 28, 2014. The game can be bought on Steam or the Humble Store.

Gameplay
Wings of Vi is an action platform game in vein of Mega Man or Cave Story. The player controls the female angel named Vi, who battles through hordes of enemies with the ultimate objective of slaying the demon lord Jeh'Oul. The game is broken up into seven levels, each containing their own unique bosses, soundtrack, and environment. The primary goal of each level is to navigate through treacherous terrain, defeat enemies, and beat a boss to progress the story. Scattered throughout the world are secrets the player can collect by completing precise jumps or exploring hidden areas. These secrets are generally unlockable cosmetics, allowing players to customize Vi and create their own outfit. There are also secrets for companions, costumes, effects, and new weapons.

The game features multiple difficulty modes as well as modifiers. Angel mode, the easiest mode, presents the player with the most checkpoints. Enemies are weaker and less frequent in Angel mode, and in areas with difficult jumps the player will find floating platforms to ease progression. Mortal mode is the standard mode of the game, and is what the game is considered to be balanced around. Demon mode, the hard mode, is noted as being for veterans of the genre only, containing few checkpoints, new attacks for bosses, and minor modifications to level design. There are also unlockable modifiers such as Hellspawn mode, which buffs Vi's HP to 400% but replaces checkpoints with healthpacks, Doomed Mode, where each hit kills Vi instantly, and Turbo Mode, which speeds up the rate at which the game runs. These modes are not mutually exclusive, and completing the game with them does not give any extra rewards. Players can however view their time, deaths, and modifiers both in-game and online in the leaderboards.

Sources

2014 video games
Side-scrolling platform games
Video games about demons
Video games developed in Denmark
Video games featuring female protagonists
Windows games
Windows-only games